"It Sure Took a Long, Long Time" is a song by American singer-songwriter Lobo. It was released as a single in 1973 from his album Calumet.

The song was a Top 40 hit on the Billboard Hot 100, peaking at No. 27. It was also a Top 5 hit on the Adult Contemporary chart, peaking at No. 3.

Chart performance

References

1973 songs
1973 singles
Lobo (musician) songs
Songs written by Lobo (musician)
Big Tree Records singles